PVT (disemvoweling of pivot) is an experimental band based between London and Sydney. Band members are Richard Pike, Laurence Pike and Dave Miller. Brothers Richard and Laurence grew up in Sydney, later meeting Dave Miller who originally comes from Perth, Australia. The band have released five albums.

History
PVT was formed as Pivot in Sydney in 1999 by brothers Richard Pike and Laurence Pike. The band spent the subsequent four years developing their sound and working on their debut album, with guitarist Richard Pike producing. They released their debut album, Make Me Love You, in August 2005 on Sensory Records. It was nominated for a J Award by national youth broadcaster Triple J. The band added Perth electronica artist Dave Miller in late 2005, omitting the old members from their line up and becoming a three piece.

In 2008, PVT signed to UK label Warp Records and O Soundtrack My Heart was released in August 2008 and the band toured across Europe and the UK. Notable shows included an appearance at 2008 Meltdown with Yellow Magic Orchestra, Glastonbury and invitations from Arctic Monkeys, Sigur Rós and Gary Numan to support on Australian tours. The band has been known to cover Talking Heads' "I Zimbra" live using live sampling to replicate up to 12 parts, and included a live version of the song on the B-side of their "O Soundtrack My Heart" tour-only 7".

In 2009 they contributed a cover of the Grizzly Bear song "Colorado" to the Warp20 (Recreated) compilation, as well as having their song "Fool in Rain" covered by Scott Herren's 'Diamond Watch Wrists'.

They released the album Church With No Magic in July 2010.

In 2012, the band performed as part of the Vivid Live Festival at the Sydney Opera House. They were also announced as the support for Gotye's arena tour of Australia in December. In the same year the band signed to Felte and to Australian independent record label Create/Control in 2012 and released their 4th album Homosapien on 8 February 2013 in Australia and New Zealand.

Name 
The first two releases by the band appeared under the name Pivot. In 2010, the group decided to remove the vowels from their name after a legal claim was made from an American band of the same name. Although in print it is PVT, the band can legally be called Pivot in all territories outside USA. Richard Pike said "It was frustrating and kind of ridiculous, but it became quickly obvious that it was a legal battle in the US we may not even win, and one we just couldn’t afford to lose. So in the end, we weren't fazed by it. Altering the name just seemed to be another step in the process for the record to come out and be heard… At the end of the day it’s small change..."

Members
 Richard Pike - vocals, guitar, bass, keyboards, production
 Laurence Pike - drums, keyboards, percussion
 Dave Miller - laptop, production

Discography

Albums

Awards and nominations

J Award
The J Awards are an annual series of Australian music awards that were established by the Australian Broadcasting Corporation's youth-focused radio station Triple J. They commenced in 2005.

|-
| J Award of 2005
| Make Me Love You
| Australian Album of the Year
| 
|-

National Live Music Awards
The National Live Music Awards (NLMAs) are a broad recognition of Australia's diverse live industry, celebrating the success of the Australian live scene. The awards commenced in 2016.

|-
| National Live Music Awards of 2016
| Laurence Pike (PVT)
| Live Drummer of the Year
| 
|-

References

Australian rock music groups
Musical groups established in 1999
1999 establishments in Australia
New South Wales musical groups
Warp (record label) artists